Mark O'Shea (born 16 February 1977) is an Australian singer-songwriter. He had a solo career in the 1990s, before forming the band Zinc in 2002. In 2007, he formed O'Shea with his wife Jay.

Biography

1977–2001: Solo career
Mark O'Shea was born on 16 February 1977. At the age of 17 in 1993, O'Shea won the Gympie Music Muster talent competition which subsequently led to a record deal with ABC Country.

Mark's debut album None Of The Above was released in 1996 and he won Golden Guitar Awards at the CMAA in 1996 and 1997.

2002–2007: Zinc

In 2002, Mark formed the rock/pop group Zinc with brother John O'Shea and Adam Ray. The band released one studio album in 2005 and disbanded in 2007. In 2006, Mark toured as a guitarist for Ronn Moss.

2007–present: O'Shea

In 2007, Mark and wife Jay moved to Nashville, Tennessee and began performing as a duo. In 2010, the pair began hosting their own TV show called O'Shea USA which aired on Australia’s Country Music Channel (CMC).

The duo have released four studio albums between 2011 and 2017; all of which have peaked inside the ARIA top 50.

Discography

Studio albums

Singles

See also
 Zinc
 O'Shea

Awards

Country Music Awards of Australia
The Country Music Awards of Australia (CMAA) (also known as the Golden Guitar Awards) is an annual awards night held in January during the Tamworth Country Music Festival, celebrating recording excellence in the Australian country music industry. They have been held annually since 1973.

|-
| 1996
| "The Swimming Song" by Mark O'Shea 
| New Talent of the Year
| 
|-
| 1997
| "The Dreamer" by Mark O'Shea (directed by Ross Wood)
| Video Track of the Year
| 

 Note: wins only

References

1977 births
Australian emigrants to the United States
Australian rock singers
20th-century Australian male singers
Living people